One California is a , 32-story office skyscraper completed in 1969 in the Financial District of San Francisco, California. It is the 31st-tallest building in the city. The architect of the building was Welton Becket Associates.

History
The building was constructed on the site of the previously demolished Fife Building and was one of the earliest modern skyscrapers constructed in the city. It was the fifth tallest building in San Francisco when it was completed but is no longer in the top 30. One California was one of three buildings, the other two being 555 California Street and McKesson Plaza, that was featured in a 1970 Newsweek article widely thought to have coined the term "Manhattanization".

In 1995, Shorenstein became the sole owner of the tower and invested US$5 million in an extensive lobby and plaza renovation.

Corporate signage
One California is one of very few downtown office skyscrapers in San Francisco to feature corporate signage at the top of the tower.  When it was constructed, the building's signage read "Mutual Benefit Life" for the insurance company. Sometime after the building went up, the San Francisco Planning Code was changed to prohibit signs above  on new buildings. Existing buildings were grandfathered in and allowed for replacing signs as long as the new sign is no larger in surface area and projection than the existing sign.

After Mutual Benefit Life went out of business, the building's sign was changed in April 1995 to the logo for AirTouch, which had its headquarters in the building. In October 2005, the AirTouch signs were removed and replaced with the current US Bank logo.

Tenants
 Alpine Investors
 Grosvenor Group
 Lennar
 Salesforce
 Perella Weinberg Partners
 Included Health

See also

 List of tallest buildings in San Francisco

Notes

References

External links

Skyscraper office buildings in San Francisco
Financial District, San Francisco
Welton Becket buildings
Office buildings completed in 1969
Leadership in Energy and Environmental Design gold certified buildings